Thomas-Michael Gribow was conductor of the Akademische Orchestervereinigung in Göttingen, Germany from 1991-2003.; He is also study leader and conductor of the Chemnitz Opera.

References 

German male conductors (music)
Living people
21st-century German conductors (music)
21st-century German male musicians
Year of birth missing (living people)